Swaroop Kanchi (born 29 June 1983) is an Indian film director, producer and screenwriter.

Making feature-length English-languageprimarily independent films through Tapas Films, based in Bangalore, Karnatakahis films include the romance-drama films Hong Kong Dreaming (2008) and Bengaloored (2010).

Early life and education
He was born in Bangalore, a pre-mature child born at just  months, his father is also an actor who worked in more than 50 films before quitting acting for good. His mother was a businesswoman, however he showed no inclination towards films at an early age instead choosing to play tennis. He studied in Bangalore before starting off his career as a junior tennis player, moving to chennai after being selected at the prestigious Britannia Amritraj Tennis program. He came back to Bangalore before being forced to quit tennis for personal reasons.

Career
Kanchi, a design student learnt the art of filmmaking by himself. He started off with a few low-budget films which earned him recognition for his creativity, technique, approach and story-telling skills. One of his first films Something Taboo, dealt with misconceptions about sexually transmitted diseases and myths about HIVone of his first attempts at socially relevant films.

He worked on the film Black Sugar which premiered at the New York Film Festival. Kanchi has also worked on Sleeping with the Enemy's Son, Acid and Taxiwallah, all American independent films made in Los Angeles, California.

Presently based in Bangalore Kanchi has worked on films promoting education for street children with a film for Akanksha. Kanchi also collaborated with DreamWorks Executive to make a film on the similarities and differences between Bollywood and Hollywood; the film featured many notable film personalities of Indian film industry. He has also made a documentary film about the Kumbh Mela a mass Hindu pilgrimage.  This was followed by non-fiction film projects based on Indian spirituality and cultural heritage in Cambodia, the Himalayas, India and Thailand.

Hong Kong Dreaming (2008), an English-language film shot in Hong Kong, made with British actress Fiona Man, and Singaporean actor Kai Wong, resulting in the only Indo-Hong Kong film to date. The film premiered at the International Film Festival of England and later at the Bengalooru Film Festival.

In 2008, Kanchi served as the Executive Producer on the short film Supraman and the School of Necessity with UK-based filmmakers.  The film's cast were from real slums in Bangalore and stars a young child from an orphanage.  It earned international acclaim and was lauded by many internationally acclaimed directors and film personalities. The film brought awareness to the cause of every child's right to basic education.

His film Bengaloored (2010) was set for an all Indian wide release in 2010.

In 2014 Yeh Dil Ramta Jogi Released, his first Hindi film, also his first starring role in a film. The film also co-starred Cajole Kapoor, Rageshwari Mahanta and noted Bollywood actor Sunil Kumar Palwal. The film was followed by Mudita, another Indian English film starring Padmavati Rao, Swaroop Kanchi, Shivani Parmar, Irshikaa Mehrotra, Alistar Bennis and Sudha NarasimhaRaju. The film premiered at the Marche Du film at Cannes Film Festival and finally Released on Amazon Prime Video World Wide.

Kanchi has been working on a film called Tripura Rahasya a big-budget film to be shot mostly in India.

Filmography

See also

 List of Indian film directors
 List of Indian writers
 List of film producers
 List of people from Bangalore
 List of people from Mumbai

References

 swaroop Kanchi set to take his film to Cannes- Times of India
 John, Rajeev K.; Jo, Subin (19 September 2008). "Hosur to HollywoodA Street Kid's Journey".  Bangalore Mirror. Retrieved 31 January 2012.
 Yograj_M (3 November 2009).  "Swaroop Kanchi on 'Bengaloored'".  mybangalore.com. Retrieved 31 January 2012.
http://www.rediff.com/movies/slide-show/slide-show-1-south-swaroop-kanchi-on-directing-bangaloored/20091113.htm

External links 
 swaroopkanchi.com Kanchi's official website
 
 Swaroop Kanchi on Facebook
 Swaroop Kanchi on Twitter
 bengaloored.com, official website for Bengaloored (2010)
 buddhaa.com, official website for new film

1983 births
21st-century Indian film directors
Kannada film directors
Kannada film producers
Living people
Film producers from Bangalore
Film directors from Bangalore
Screenwriters from Bangalore